Harith Naem bin Jaineh (born 26 January 2002) is a Malaysian professional footballer who plays as a forward for Malaysia Super League club Perak.

References

External links

Living people
People from Sabah
Malaysian footballers
Sabah F.C. (Malaysia) players
Malaysia Super League players
Association football forwards
2002 births